The First Iraqi–Kurdish War (Arabic: الحرب العراقية الكردية الأولى) also known as Aylul revolts was a major event of the Iraqi–Kurdish conflict, lasting from 1961 until 1970. The struggle was led by Mustafa Barzani, in an attempt to establish an autonomous Kurdish administration in northern Iraq. Throughout the 1960s, the uprising escalated into a long war, which failed to resolve despite internal power changes in Iraq. During the war, 80% of the Iraqi army was engaged in combat with the Kurds. The war ended with a stalemate in 1970, resulting in between 75,000 to 105,000 casualties. A series of Iraqi–Kurdish negotiations followed the war in an attempt to resolve the conflict. The negotiations led to the Iraqi–Kurdish Autonomy Agreement of 1970.

Background

After the military coup by Abdul Karim Qasim in 1958, Barzani was invited by Qasim to return from exile. As part of a deal arranged by Qasim and Barzani, Qasim promised to give the Kurds regional autonomy in return for Barzani's support for his policies. Meanwhile, during 1959–1960, Barzani became the head of the Kurdistan Democratic Party (KDP), which was granted legal status in 1960.

Warfare

By early 1960, it became apparent that Qasim would not follow through with his promise of regional autonomy. As a result, the KDP began to agitate for regional autonomy. In the face of growing Kurdish dissent, as well as Barzani's personal power, Qasim began to incite the Barzanis historical enemies, the Bradost and Zebari tribes, which led to intertribal warfare throughout 1960 and early 1961.

By February 1961, Barzani had defeated the pro-government forces and consolidated his position as leader of the Kurds. At this point, Barzani ordered his forces to occupy and expel government officials from all Kurdish territory. This was not received well in Baghdad, and as a result, Qasim began to prepare for a military offensive against the north to return government control of the region. Meanwhile, in June 1961, the KDP issued a detailed ultimatum to Qasim outlining Kurdish grievances and demanded rectification. Qasim ignored the Kurdish demands and continued his planning for war. It was not until September 10, when an Iraqi army column was ambushed by a group of Kurds, that the Kurdish revolt truly began. In response to the attack, Qasim lashed out and ordered the Iraqi Air Force to indiscriminately bomb Kurdish villages, which ultimately served to rally the entire Kurdish population to Barzani's standard.

Due to Qasim's profound distrust of the Iraqi Army, which he purposely failed to adequately arm (in fact, Qasim implemented a policy of ammunition rationing), Qasim's government was not able to subdue the insurrection. This stalemate irritated powerful factions within the military and is said to be one of the main reasons behind the Ba'athist coup against Qasim in February 1963.

Kurdish villages were targeted by United States supplied munitions consisting napalm bombs numbering 1,000 and 4,000 other bombs which were given by the United States to the Ba'athist government in Baghdad to use against the Kurds. Entire Kurdish villages and livestock were incinerated by the napalm bombs. The decision to supply napalm and other weapons to the Ba'athist was backed by American President Kennedy. Napalm bombs were also sold to Iraq by the United Kingdom. French Ambassador Bernard Dorin witnessed a girl in Iraqi Kurdistan whose face was burned off by the UK made bombs.

After the failure of the Syrian political union with Egypt in 1961, Syria was declared an Arab Republic in the interim constitution. On 23 August 1962, the government conducted a special population census only for the province of Jazira which was predominantly Kurdish. As a result, around 120,000 Kurds in Jazira were arbitrarily categorized as aliens. In addition, a media campaign was launched against the Kurds with slogans such as Save Arabism in Jazira! and Fight the Kurdish threat!. These policies coincided with the beginning of Barzani's uprising in Iraqi Kurdistan and discovery of oilfields in the Kurdish inhabited areas of Syria. In June 1963, Syria took part in the Iraqi military campaign against the Kurds by providing aircraft, armoured vehicles and a force of 6,000 soldiers. Syrian troops crossed the Iraqi border and moved into the Kurdish town of Zakho in pursuit of Barzani's fighters.

The Kurdish uprising received material support from Iran and Israel—both of them wishing to weaken Iraq. Israel regarded the Iraqi military as a possible threat in case of renewed fighting between Israel and Jordan and Syria. Iraqi forces had participated in the 1948 Arab invasion of Israel and Iraq was the only Arab participant in that war who refused to sign ceasefire agreements with Israel. Since then Iraq had on a number of occasions threatened to send forces to assist Jordan against Israel during rounds of border fighting between the two. Therefore, the Israelis wished to keep the Iraqis occupied elsewhere. Another Israeli interest was Kurdish assistance for Jews still living in Iraq to escape through Kurdish territory to Israel. Iran wished to strengthen its own political and military position vis-à-vis Iraq—the only other regional power in the Persian Gulf—and perhaps wring certain territorial concessions from Iraq in return for ceasing support of the Kurds (this was achieved in 1975, during the Second Iraqi-Kurdish War, but it is not clear when the idea was originally conceived).

In November 1963, after considerable infighting amongst the civilian and military wings of the Ba'athists, they were ousted by Abdul Salam Arif in a coup. Then, after another failed offensive on Kurds, Arif declared a ceasefire in February 1964, which provoked a split among Kurdish urban radicals on one hand and Peshmerga forces, led by Barzani on the other. Barzani agreed to the ceasefire and fired the radicals from the party. Following the unexpected death of Arif, whereupon he was replaced by his brother, Abdul Rahman Arif, the Iraqi government launched a last-ditch effort to defeat the Kurds. This campaign failed in May 1966, when Barzani forces thoroughly defeated the Iraqi Army at the Battle of Mount Handrin, near Rawanduz. At this battle, it was said that the Kurds slaughtered an entire Iraqi brigade. Recognizing the futility of continuing this campaign, Rahamn Arif announced a 12-point peace program in June 1966, which was not implemented due to the overthrow of Abdul Rahman Arif in a 1968 coup by the Baath Party.

The Ba'ath government restarted a campaign to end the Kurdish insurrection, which stalled in 1969. This can be partly attributed to the internal power struggle in Baghdad and also tensions with Iran. Moreover, the Soviet Union pressured the Iraqis to come to terms with Barzani.

Peace talks

A peace plan was announced in March 1970 and provided for broader Kurdish autonomy. The plan also gave Kurds representation in government bodies, to be implemented in four years. Despite this, the Iraqi government embarked on an Arabization program in the oil rich regions of Kirkuk and Khanaqin in the same period.

Aftermath

In the following years, the Iraqi government overcame its internal divisions and concluded a treaty of friendship with the Soviet Union in April 1972 and ended its isolation within the Arab world. On the other hand, Kurds remained dependent on the Iranian military support and could do little to strengthen their forces. By 1974 the situation in the north escalated again into the Second Iraqi–Kurdish War, which lasted until 1975.

See also
 Ramadan Revolution
 Kurdish rebellion of 1983
 1991 uprisings in Iraq
 List of modern conflicts in the Middle East

References

1960s in Iraq
1970 in Iraq
Wars involving Syria
Kurdish-Iraqi War
Civil wars in Iraq
Iraqi–Kurdish conflict
1960s conflicts
Conflicts in 1970
Proxy wars